Klaus Scholtz (22 March 1908 – 1 May 1987) was a commander in the Kriegsmarine (navy) of Nazi Germany during World War II. He commanded the Type IXB U-boat . Scholtz was a recipient of the Knight's Cross of the Iron Cross with Oak Leaves.

Career
Scholtz joined the Reichsmarine in 1927 as member of "Crew 1927" (the incoming class of 1927) and served in torpedo boats, before transferring to the U-boat arm (U-bootwaffe) in April 1940. From October 1940 he commanded U-108, sinking 25 ships on 8 patrols, for a total of 128,190 tons of Allied shipping, including the British armed merchant cruiser . In October 1942 Scholtz formed and took command of 12th U-boat Flotilla based at Bordeaux, France.

In August 1944 the approach of Allied troops meant that the base had to be evacuated. The last U-boats escaped by sea, and Scholtz attempted to lead the remaining men (about 220) back to Germany on foot. They left Bordeaux on 26 August, but were captured on 11 September by American forces in Loire. Scholtz spent the next 18 months in US captivity.

Post-war, Scholtz served in the Bundesgrenzschutz-See - the naval arm of the Federal Border Guards - from 1953 to 1956, then transferred to the Bundesmarine, serving as commander of several naval bases, including Kiel, Cuxhaven, and Wilhelmshaven. He retired in 1966 with the rank of Kapitän zur See, and died in 1987.

Awards
 Iron Cross (1939) 2nd and 1st Class
 Knight's Cross of the Iron Cross with Oak Leaves
 Knight's Cross on 26 December 1941 as Kapitänleutnant and commander of U-108
 123rd Oak Leaves on 10 September 1942 as Korvettenkapitän and commander of U-108

References

Citations

Bibliography

 
 
 
 

1908 births
1982 deaths
German Navy personnel
Military personnel from Magdeburg
People from the Province of Saxony
Recipients of the Knight's Cross of the Iron Cross with Oak Leaves
U-boat commanders (Kriegsmarine)
Reichsmarine personnel
German military personnel of the Spanish Civil War
Kriegsmarine personnel of World War II